Dough Zone is an American chain of Chinese restaurants.

History 
Jason and Nancy Zhai opened the original restaurant in Bellevue, Washington, in 2014. There were seven restaurants in Washington and two locations in California, as of November 2021. 

The business expanded into Portland, Oregon, in April 2022.

See also

 List of Chinese restaurants

References

External links

 

2014 establishments in Washington (state)
Chinese restaurants in Portland, Oregon
Chinese restaurants in the United States
Chinese-American culture in California
Chinese-American culture in Washington (state)
Restaurant chains in the United States
Restaurants in California
Asian restaurants in Washington (state)